Mar Addai II (born Shlemun Giwargis  6 January 1948 – 11 February 2022) was Catholicos-Patriarch of the Ancient Church of the East. He resided in the Apostolic See of Seleucia-Ctesiphon in Baghdad, Iraq.

Early life and consecration 
Mar Addai II was born on 6 January 1948, in Mosul, the capital of the Nineveh governorate in Iraq. He was ordained to the diaconate and elevated to the priesthood on 15 September 1968 in Baghdad. He was consecrated a metropolitan of the Church of the East for Iraq on 22 September 1968 at Mar Zaia Cathedral in Baghdad, Iraq. Following the death of Mar Thoma Darmo, he was elected as Catholicos-Patriarch of the Ancient Church of the East and was consecrated on 20 February 1972 by Mar Narsai Toma, Metropolitan of Kirkuk, and Mar Thoma Eramia, Metropolitan of Nineveh.

Tenure as Catholicos-Patriarch 
In December 1969, as acting patriarch, Mar Addai II elevated Mar Narsai Toma to Metropolitan of Kirkuk and Mar Toma Eramia as Metropolitan of Mosul and Northern Iraq. He was officially elected to the position of Catholicos-Patriarch in February 1970, several months after the death of Mar Thoma Darmo. Two years later, on 20 February 1972, he was consecrated as Patriarch of the Ancient Church of the East by Mar Narsai and Mar Toma. The ordination took place at St. Zaia Cathedral in Iraq.

On Sunday, 24 September 2006, St Mary's Cathedral, the home of Mar Addai II, was bombed. The cathedral, located in the Riyadh district of Baghdad, experienced dual bombings: A small improvised explosive device preceded a car detonation setting off a large number of explosives. The bombings occurred within minutes of each other. The bombing was carefully timed to occur just as parishioners exited the church following Sunday morning services. Two civilians were killed in the attacks, in addition to the 20 that sustained injuries.

Death 
Mar Addai II died in Phoenix, Arizona, on February 11, 2022, at age 74.

References

Sources 

 
 
 
 
 
 
 

1948 births
2022 deaths
Ancient Church of the East
Iraqi archbishops
Patriarchs of the East
People from Mosul